Kya Sand is an industrial suburb of Johannesburg, South Africa. It is located in Region A of the City.  The suburb is bordered to the east by Kya Sands Informal Settlement.

References

Johannesburg Region A